Abdul Ghafar Ghafoori (15 September 1937) born in Kabul is a former Afghanistan athlete, who competed at the 1960 Summer Olympic Games in the Men's 4 × 100 m Relay, the team failed to advance.

References

External links
 

Athletes (track and field) at the 1960 Summer Olympics
Olympic athletes of Afghanistan
1937 births
Living people
Afghan male sprinters
Sportspeople from Kabul